Filodrillia dulcis is a species of sea snail, a marine gastropod mollusk in the family Borsoniidae.

Description

Distribution
This marine species is endemic to Australia and occurs off South Australia and Tasmania.

References

 Sowerby, G.B., III. (1896) List of the Pleurotomidae of South Australia, with descriptions of some new species. Proceedings of the Malacological Society of London, 2, 24–32, pl. 3
 Verco, J.C. 1909. Notes on South Australian marine Mollusca with descriptions of new species. Part XII. Transactions of the Royal Society of South Australia 33: 293-342
 Hedley, C. 1922. A revision of the Australian Turridae. Records of the Australian Museum 13(6): 213-359, pls 42-56

dulcis
Gastropods of Australia
Gastropods described in 1896